Ben Vorlich is a mountain in the Southern Highlands of Scotland. It lies south of Loch Earn and Ardvorlich, and a short distance north of the neighbouring mountain Stùc a' Chroin.

Due to its prominence when seen from the lower ground of the Central Belt, Ben Vorlich is one of the most commonly seen of Munros, Scotland's peaks of at least  elevation. It lies in an area of land bounded to the north by Loch Earn and to the west by Loch Lubnaig. The town of Callander lies to the south. 

Ben Vorlich is most frequently climbed from Ardvorlich to the north. A path leads up Glen Vorlich, and then heads for the mountain's northern ridge. The summit lies 4 km from Ardvorlich. Many walkers then continue on to the neighbouring mountain, Stùc a' Chroin, by way of Ben Vorlich's south west ridge. Return to Ardvorlich can be made without re-ascending Ben Vorlich, as a path leads from the bealach between the two hills round Ben Vorlich's northwestern slope to meet the main ascent path. Other possible routes from the southern side allow one to ascend Ben Vorlich by way of its southeastern ridge. This can be accessed either from Glen Artney to the southeast or Callander to the south.

References

External links

Ben Vorlich Routes from Lochearn Routes and images on Ben Vorlich
Computer generated summit panoramas NorthSouth index

Mountains and hills of the Southern Highlands
Marilyns of Scotland
Munros
Mountains and hills of Stirling (council area)
Mountains and hills of Perth and Kinross